Gems Forever is an album by Mantovani and His Orchestra. It was released in 1958 by London (catalog no. PS-106). It debuted on Billboard magazine's pop album chart on May 19, 1958, peaked at the No. 5 spot, and remained on the chart for 56 weeks. It was an RIAA certified gold album (minimum 500,000 units sold). AllMusic later gave the album a rating of four-and-a-half stars.

Track listing
Side A
 "All the Things You Are"
 "True Love"
 "I Could Have Danced All Night"
 "You Keep Coming Back Like a Song"
 "A Woman in Love"
 "This Nearly Was Mine"

Side B
 "Summertime"
 "Something to Remember You By"
 "Love Letters"
 "The Nearness of You"
 "An Affair to Remember"
 Hey There"

References

1958 albums
London Records albums
Mantovani albums